Bawię się świetnie is the fifth studio album by Polish singer Ania, released in 2012.

Background 
The album, whose title translates I'm Having Great Fun, was a departure from Ania's trademark retro style. Lyrics, written by Ania herself, were more introvertive, referencing the singer's state of mind as a 30-year-old woman.

Bawię się świetnie reached #2 in Polish albums chart and was Ania's first not to become a #1 album. However, it went Platinum for shifting more than 40,000 copies in Poland.

Track listing 
 "Nadziejka" - 5:35
 "Bawię się świetnie" - 3:47
 "Sublokatorka" - 4:00
 "Bez cienia nadziei" - 2:04
 "Dorosłość oddać musisz albo niepewność" - 4:06
 "Jej zapach" - 3:11
 "Przy sąsiednim stoliku" - 3:05
 "Na oślep" - 4:35
 "Jeszcze ten jeden raz" - 4:00
 "Kiedyś mi powiesz kim chcesz być" - 4:34

Singles 
 2012: "Bawię się świetnie"
 2012: "Kiedyś mi powiesz kim chcesz być"
 2013: "Jeszcze ten jeden raz"

References 

2012 albums
Ania (singer) albums